Michael David Scott (born 14 November 1933) is an English former first-class cricketer.

Scott was born at Marylebone in November 1933. He was educated at Winchester College, before going up to Worcester College, Oxford. While studying at Oxford he made his debut in first-class cricket for Oxford University against Yorkshire at Oxford in 1956. He appeared in six first-class matches for the university in 1956, before making a further fourteen appearances in 1957. Playing as a wicket-keeper, Scott scored 495 runs at an average of 15.96, with a high score of 52. Behind the stumps he took 24 catches and made 11 stumpings. He later played minor counties cricket for Wiltshire, making three appearances in the 1959 Minor Counties Championship. He made a final appearance in first-class cricket in 1963, when he played for the Marylebone Cricket Club against Oxford University at Lord's.

References

External links

1933 births
Living people
People from Marylebone
People educated at Winchester College
Alumni of Worcester College, Oxford
English cricketers
Oxford University cricketers
Wiltshire cricketers
Marylebone Cricket Club cricketers